Bothremydidae is an extinct family of side-necked turtles (Pleurodira) known from the Cretaceous and Cenozoic. They are closely related to Podocnemididae, and are amongst the most widely distributed pleurodire groups, with their fossils having been found in Africa, India, the Middle East, Europe, North America and South America. Bothremydids were aquatic turtles with a high morphological diversity, indicative of generalist, molluscivorous, and piscivorous diets. Unlike modern pleurodires, which are exclusively freshwater, bothremydids inhabited freshwater, marine and coastal settings. Their marine habits allowed bothremydids to disperse across oceanic barriers into Europe and North America during the early Late Cretaceous (Cenomanian). The youngest records of the group are indeterminate remains from Saudi Arabia and Oman, dating to the Miocene.

Taxonomy 
The family is split into two subfamilies and a number of tribes.

Bothremydidae
Pleurochayah appalachius Adrian et al., 2021 Woodbine Formation, Texas, Late Cretaceous (Cenomanian)
"Chrysemys" montolivensis Roman 1897 Montoulieu, France, Oligocene (Rupelian)
Sindhochelys ragei Lapparent de broin et al., 2021 Khadro Formation, Pakistan, Paleocene (Danian)
 Subfamily Bothremydinae Gaffney et al., 2006
 Tribe Bothremydini Gaffney et al., 2006
Palauchelys López-Conde et al. 2021 Olmos Formation, Mexico, Late Cretaceous (Campanian)
Khargachelys AbdelGawad et al. 2021 Quseir Formation, Egypt, Late Cretaceous (Campanian) 
 Subtribe Bothremydina Gaffney et al., 2006
 Akoranemys Pérez-García, 2021. Madagascar, Late Cretaceous (Cenomanian)
Algorachelus Pérez-García 2017
Algorachelus parvus (Haas 1978) Bet-Meir Formation, Amminadav Formation, Palestine, Late Cretaceous (Cenomanian)
Algorachelus peregrinus Pérez-García 2017 Utrillas Formation, Spain, Nazaré, Portugal, Late Cretaceous (Cenomanian)
Algorachelus tibert (Joyce et al. 2016) Naturita Formation, Utah, Late Cretaceous (Cenomanian) (alternatively considered the only member of the genus Paiutemys)
Araiochelys Gaffney et al., 2006  Ouled Abdoun Basin, Morocco, Paleocene
 Araiochelys hirayamai Gaffney et al., 2006
 Bothremys Leidy, 1865 (jr synonym: Karkaemys)
 Bothremys arabicus (Zalmout et al., 2005) Wadi Umm Ghudran Formation, Jordan, Late Cretaceous (Santonian)
 Bothremys cooki Leidy, 1865 Merchantville Formation, Navesink Formation, New Jersey,  Tar Heel Formation, North Carolina, Late Cretaceous (Campanian-Maastrichtian)
 Bothremys kellyi Gaffney et al., 2006 Ouled Abdoun Basin, Morocco, Paleocene
 Bothremys maghrebiana Gaffney et al., 2006 Ouled Abdoun Basin, Morocco, Paleocene
 Chedighaii Gaffney et al., 2006
 Chedighaii barberi (Schmidt, 1940) Brownstone Marl, Arkansas, Blufftown Formation, Georgia, Marshalltown Formation, New Jersey,  Tar Heel Formation, North Carolina, Late Cretaceous (Campanian)
 Chedighaii hutchisoni Gaffney et al., 2006 Cerro del Pueblo Formation, Mexico, Late Cretaceous (Campanian) Kirtland Formation, New Mexico, Tar Heel Formation, North Carolina, Late Cretaceous (Campanian)
 Rosasia Costa, 1940 Argilas de Aveiro Formation, Portugal, Late Cretaceous (Campanian-Maastrichtian)
 Rosasia soutoi Carrington da Costa, 1940
 Inaechelys Carvalho, 2016 Maria Farinha Formation, Brasil, Paleocene
 Inaechelys pernambucensis Caralho, 2016
 Zolhafah Lapparent de Broin and Werner, 1998  Dakhla Formation, Egypt, Late Cretaceous (Maastrichtian)
 Zolhafah bella Lapparent de Broin and Werner, 1998
 Subtribe Foxemydina Gaffney et al., 2006
 Elochelys Nopsca, 1931 France, Spain, Late Cretaceous (Campanian-Maastrichtian)
 Elochelys perfecta Nopsca, 1931
 Foxemys Tong et al., 1998 Csehbánya Formation, Hungary, Late Cretaceous (Santonian)  Argiles et Grès à Reptiles Formation, Marnes d'Auzas Formation, Marnes Rouges Inferieures Formation, Lestaillats Marls Formation, France,  Late Cretaceous (Campanian-Maastrichtian), Villalba de la Sierra Formation, Spain, Late Cretaceous (Campanian)
 Foxemys mechinorum Tong et al., 1998
Palemys Gray, 1870
Palemys bowerbankii (Owen, 1842) London Clay Formation, England, Eocene (Ypresian)
 Polysternon Portis, 1882 Argiles et Grès à Reptiles Formation, Rognacian Formation, France, Vitoria Formation, Laño, Tremp Formation, Sierra Perenchiza Formation, Spain, Late Cretaceous (Campanian-Maastrichtian)
 Polysternon provinciale (Matheron, 1869)
 Puentemys Cadena et al., 2012 Cerrejón Formation, Colombia, Paleocene
 Puentemys mushaisaensis Cadena et al., 2012
Tartaruscola Pérez-García, 2016 Saint-Papoul, France, Eocene (Ypresian)
Iberoccitanemys Pérez-García et al. 2012 Vegas de Matute Formation, Villalba de la Sierra Formation, Spain, Campanian Marnes d'Auzas Formation, France, Maastrichtian
Iberoccitanemys atlanticum (Lapparent de Broin and Murelaga, 1996 originally Polysternon atlanticum)   syn Iberoccitanemys convenarum (Laurent et al., 2002) 
 Tribe Taphrosphyini Gaffney et al., 2006
 Ilatardia Pérez-García, 2019 Farin Doutchi Formation, Niger, Late Cretaceous (Maastrichtian)
 Subtribe Nigermydina Gaffney et al., 2006
 Arenila Lapparent de Broin and Werner, 1998 Dakhla Formation, Egypt, Late Cretaceous (Maastrichtian)
 Arenila krebsi Lapparent de Broin and Werner, 1998
 Subtribe Taphrosphyina Gaffney et al., 2006
 Azabbaremys Gaffney et al., 2001 Teberemt Formation, Mali, Paleocene
 Azabbaremys moragjonesi Gaffney et al., 2001
 Eotaphrosphys Perez-Garcia, 2018 Mont-Aimé, France, Late Cretaceous (Maastrichtian)
 Eotaphrosphys ambiguum (Gaudry, 1890)
 Labrostochelys Gaffney et al., 2006 Ouled Abdoun Basin, Morocco, Paleocene
 Labrostochelys galkini Gaffney et al., 2006
 Motelomama Perez-Garcia, 2018 Salina Group, Peru, Eocene (Ypresian)
 Motelomama olssoni (Schmidt, 1931)
 Phosphatochelys Gaffney and Tong, 2003 Ouled Abdoun Basin, Morocco, Paleocene
 Phosphatochelys tedfordi Gaffney and Tong, 2003
 Rhothonemys Gaffney et al., 2006 Ouled Abdoun Basin, Morocco, Paleocene
 Rhothonemys brinkmani Gaffney et al., 2006  
 Taphrosphys Cope, 1869 (jr synonyms: Amblypeza, Bantuchelys, Prochonias)	
 Taphrosphys congolensis (Dollo, 1912) Landana Formation, Angola, Paleocene
 Taphrosphys dares Hay, 1908 (nomen dubium)
 Taphrosphys ippolitoi Gaffney et al., 2006 Ouled Abdoun Basin, Morocco, Paleocene
 Taphrosphys sulcatus (Leidy, 1856) Hornerstown Formation, New Egypt Formation, New Jersey, Late Cretaceous (Maastrichtian)
 Ummulisani Gaffney et al., 2006 Morocco, Eocene (Ypresian)
 Ummulisani rutgersensis Gaffney et al., 2006
 Crassachelys Bergounioux, 1952 (nomen dubium)
 Crassachelys neurirregularis Bergounioux, 1952
 Eusarkia Bergounioux, 1952 (nomen dubium)
 Eusarkia rotundiformis Bergounioux, 1952
 Gafsachelys Stefano, 1903 (nomen dubium)
 Gafsachelys phosphatica Stefano, 1903
 Gafsachelys moularensis Bergounioux, 1955
 Tribe Cearachelyini Gaffney et al., 2006
 Cearachelys Gaffney et al., Santana Formation, Brazil, Early Cretaceous (Albian)
 Cearachelys placidoi Gaffney et al., 2001
 Elkanemys Maniel, de la Fuente and Canale, 2021 Candeleros Formation, Argentina, Late Cretaceous (Cenomanian)
 Elkanemys pritchardi Maniel, de la Fuente and Canale, 2021
 Itapecuruemys Batista et al., 2020 Itapecuru Formation, Brasil, Early Cretaceous (Aptian)
 Itapecuruemys amazoniensis Batista et al., 2020
 Galianemys Gaffney et al., 2002 Kem Kem Group, Morocco, Late Cretaceous (Cenomanian)
 Galianemys emringeri Gaffney et al., 2002
 Galianemys whitei Gaffney et al., 2002
 Subfamily Kurmademydinae Gaffney et al., 2006
 Tribe Kurmademydini Gaffney et al., 2006
 Jainemys Joyce & Bandyopadhyay, 2020 Lameta Formation, India, Late Cretaceous (Maastrichtian)
 Jainemys pisdurensis Joyce & Bandyopadhyay, 2020
 Kinkonychelys Gaffney et al., 2009  Maevarano Formation, Madagascar, Late Cretaceous (Maastrichtian)
 Kinkonychelys rogersi Gaffney et al., 2009
 Kurmademys Gaffney et al., 2001 Kallamedu Formation, India, Late Cretaceous (Maastrichtian)
 Kurmademys kallamedensis Gaffney et al., 2001
 Sankuchemys Gaffney et al., 2003 Intertrappean Beds, India,  Late Cretaceous (Maastrichtian)
 Sankuchemys sethnai Gaffney et al., 2003

Phylogeny
Below is a cladogram by Gaffney et al. in 2006:

References

 
Extinct turtles
Prehistoric reptile families